SpaceX Crew-5 was the fifth operational NASA Commercial Crew Program flight of a Crew Dragon spacecraft, and the eighth overall crewed orbital flight. The mission launched on 5 October 2022 and transported four crew members to the International Space Station (ISS), docking there on 6 October 2022 at 21:01 UTC. Two NASA astronauts, one JAXA astronaut, and one Russian cosmonaut are participating in the mission. Three of the crew members were assigned following delays to Boeing's Starliner program. Commander Nicole Mann was reassigned to the flight from Boeing's Boe-CFT mission, while Pilot Josh Cassada and Mission Specialist Koichi Wakata transferred from Boeing Starliner-1. Anna Kikina was reassigned from Soyuz MS-22. For three of the four crew members, this was their first space flight, while Wakata was a veteran of four previous space flights.

Crew
This mission was the first Crew Dragon mission to fly a Russian cosmonaut, Anna Kikina who was selected in July 2022 for this mission as a part of the Soyuz-Dragon crew swap system of keeping at least one NASA astronaut and one Roscosmos cosmonaut on each of the crew rotation missions. This ensures both countries have a presence on the station, and the ability to maintain their separate systems if either Soyuz or commercial crew vehicles are grounded for an extended period. This was the first time a Russian cosmonaut flew on a U.S. spacecraft since Nikolai Budarin flew on STS-113 and also first launch of a Russian cosmonaut on a U.S. space capsule.  The seat exchange was approved in June 2022 (by the Russians only).

Mission
The fifth SpaceX operational mission in the Commercial Crew Program (CCP) launched on 5 October 2022 and returned to Earth on 11 March 2023.

Backup for Soyuz MS-22 Crew Return
Due to the  diameter hole punctured in the radiator of Soyuz MS-22 due to micro-meteorite impact, there are doubts over the safety of Soyuz MS-22. It was therefore replaced with Soyuz MS-23, launched uncrewed on 24 February 2023.
 
Until the replacement MS-23 docks to ISS, SpaceX Crew-5 was considered among the options to return the MS-22 crew, in case of emergency. SpaceX has originally designed Crew Dragon to host a crew of seven at a time. The International Space Station mission management team decided to move NASA astronaut Francisco Rubio's Soyuz seat liner from the Soyuz MS-22 spacecraft to Dragon Endurance, in order to provide lifeboat capabilities in the event Rubio would need to return to Earth because of an emergency evacuation from the space station. The seat liner was moved on 17 January 2023, with installation and configuration continuing the following day. The change allowed for increased crew protection by reducing the heat load inside the MS-22 spacecraft for cosmonauts Prokopyev and Petelin in the event of an emergency return to Earth. The SpaceX Crew-6 space capsule is designed to bring back crew serving as an emergency evacuation option after Crew-5.
 
As MS-23 arrived at the space station on 26 February, Rubio’s seat liner was transferred to the new Soyuz on 6 March and the seat liners for Sergey Prokopyev and Dmitry Petelin were moved from MS-22 to MS-23 on 2 March, ahead of their return in the Soyuz.

References

SpaceX Dragon 2
Spacecraft launched in 2022
October 2022 events in the United States
SpaceX payloads contracted by NASA
SpaceX human spaceflights
Fully civilian crewed orbital spaceflights